Heliconius hecuba, the Hecuba longwing, is a species of butterfly of the family Nymphalidae. It lives at altitudes ranging from 1000 to 2400 m in cloud forests in the northern Andes from Colombia to Ecuador.

The butterfly is named for Hecuba, the wife of King Priam of ancient Troy.

The larvae feed on plants from the genus Granadilla.

Subspecies
Listed alphabetically:
H. h. bonplandi Neukirchen, 1991 (Ecuador)
H. h. cassandra C. & R. Felder, 1862 (Colombia)
H. h. choarina Hewitson, 1872 (Ecuador)
H. h. creusa H. & R. Holzinger, 1989 (Colombia)
H. h. crispus Staudinger, 1885 (Colombia)
H. h. flava Brown, 1979 (Ecuador)
H. h. hecuba Hewitson, 1858 (Colombia)
H. h. lamasi Neukirchen, 1991 (Ecuador)
H. h. salazari Neukirchen, 1993 (Colombia)
H. h. tolima Fassl, 1912 (Colombia)
H. h. walteri Salazar, 1998 (Colombia)

References

hecuba
Nymphalidae of South America
Butterflies described in 1853